The Ministry of Justice, Worship and Penitentiary Institutions of Equatorial Guinea handles responsibilities such as overseeing the country's bar association, creating judicial rules and procedures, and investigating human rights issues.

List of ministers (Post-1968 upon achieving independence) 

 Jesus Eworo Ndongo (1968-1969)
 Rafael Obiang Nsogo (1970-1971)
 Expedito Rafael Momo Bakara (1972-1973)
 Leoncio Placido Conte May  (1974-1975) [referred to as the Vice Minister of Justice]
 Okori Dougan Kinson (1976-1979)
 Policarpo Mansu Mba (1980-1981)
 Alfredo King Tomas (1982)
Celestino Mansogo Nsi (1983-1984)
Angel Ndongo Micha (1985-1990)
Silvestre Siale Billeka (1990-1992)
Mariano Nsue Nguema (1992-1994)
Francisco Javier Ngomo Mbengono (1994-1998) [also referred to as the Vice Minister of Justice & Religious Affairs]
 Ruben Maye Nsue (1999-2004)
 Angle Masii Mibuy (2004-2006)
 Mauricio Bokung Asumu (2006-2011)
 Francisco Javier Ngomo Mbenono (2011-2014)
 Evangelina Filomena Oyo Ebule (2014-2018) [1st female]
 Salvador Ondo Ncumu (2018–present)

See also 

Equatorial Guinea Bar Association
Justice ministry
 Politics of Equatorial Guinea

References 

Justice ministries
Government ministries of Equatorial Guinea